Eremobatidae is a family of solifuges, first described by Karl Kraepelin in 1901.

Genera 
, the World Solifugae Catalog accepts the following eight genera:

 Chanbria Muma, 1951
 Eremobates Banks, 1900
 Eremochelis Roewer, 1934
 Eremocosta Roewer, 1934
 Eremorhax Roewer, 1934
 Eremothera Muma, 1951
 Hemerotrecha Banks, 1903
 Horribates Muma, 1962

References 

Solifugae
Arachnid families